Devine  is a city in Medina County, Texas, United States. The population was 4,350 at the 2010 census. It is part of the San Antonio Metropolitan Statistical Area.

History
Devine, Texas, is named for Hon. Thomas J. Devine, a native of San Antonio.

Geography

Devine is located at  (29.143908, –98.906174). This is 25 miles southwest of Downtown San Antonio.

Demographics

2020 census

As of the 2020 United States census, there were 4,324 people, 1,734 households, and 1,294 families residing in the city.

2000 census
As of the census of 2000, there were 4,140 people, 1,443 households, and 1,079 families living in the city. The population density was 1,331.4 people per square mile (514.0/km2). There were 1,551 housing units at an average density of 498.8 per square mile (192.6/km2). The racial makeup of the city was 76.64% White, 0.68% African American, 0.77% Native American, 0.29% Asian, 18.53% from other races, and 3.09% from two or more races. Hispanic or Latino of any race were 52.25% of the population.

There were 1,443 households, out of which 38.0% had children under the age of 18 living with them, 54.7% were married couples living together, 14.1% had a female householder with no husband present, and 25.2% were non-families. 22.2% of all households were made up of individuals, and 10.7% had someone living alone who was 65 years of age or older. The average household size was 2.82 and the average family size was 3.29.

In the city, the population was spread out, with 29.3% under the age of 18, 9.6% from 18 to 24, 25.8% from 25 to 44, 21.1% from 45 to 64, and 14.2% who were 65 years of age or older. The median age was 34 years. For every 100 females, there were 95.6 males. For every 100 females age 18 and over, there were 89.6 males.

The median income for a household in the city was $28,712, and the median income for a family was $35,429. Males had a median income of $26,395 versus $18,605 for females. The per capita income for the city was $14,530. About 16.6% of families and 19.6% of the population were below the poverty line, including 24.4% of those under age 18 and 29.1% of those age 65 or over.

Education

The City of Devine is served by the Devine Independent School District.

Popular culture 
The city serves as the setting for the murder mystery The Lesser of Two Evils  by Zoe E. Whitten. NatureSweet, a tomato cultivar, was founded in the city.

Government 
The city is a General Law A Municipality with Government of a Mayor and Five Councilmen and/or Councilwomen. The mayor is Cory Thompson.

Gallery

References

External links

 City of Devine
 Handbook of Texas Online: Devine, Texas
 City of Devine Modern photos.

Cities in Texas
Cities in Medina County, Texas
Greater San Antonio